Sir Nicholas Proctor Goodison (16 May 1934 – 6 July 2021) was a British businessman who was chairman of the London Stock Exchange from 1976 to 1986. He was an important supporter of the arts and the President of the Furniture History Society (FHS).

Career 
Goodison was born in Watford, the son of Edmund Harold Goodison and Eileen Mary Carrington Proctor. He was educated at Marlborough College and then King's College, Cambridge, of which he was an honorary fellow. He was made a Knight Bachelor in the 1982 New Year Honours.

He served as chairman of the Courtauld Institute of Art from 1982 to 2002 and of the National Art Collections Fund (now The Art Fund) from 1986 to 2002.

He appeared as a castaway on the BBC Radio programme Desert Island Discs on 1 March 1987.

Artistic legacy 
The National Portrait Gallery, London holds two portraits of Goodison in its collection, a bust by Ivor Roberts-Jones and a photograph by Lucy Anne Dickens. His portrait in oil, by Tom Phillips, is in the Stock Exchange's collection. A preparatory sketch made in oil on panel in 2006 was acquired from the artist by the Art Fund and is in the Courtauld Gallery.

Personal life 
Sir Nicholas married Judith Abel Smith (b. 21 January 1939) on 18 June, 1960: they had a son, Adam, and two daughters, Katharine and Rachel.

He died on 6 July 2021, at the age of 87.

References 

British businesspeople
Businesspeople awarded knighthoods
Knights Bachelor
1934 births
2021 deaths
Alumni of King's College, Cambridge
People from Watford
Honorary Fellows of the British Academy